is a Japanese professional basketball guard currently signed to the SeaHorses Mikawa. In 2005, he skipped college and started playing professional basketball, following Kazuo Nakamura's advice.  In 2009, he decided to leave the Japan Basketball League and try to earn a contract in the NBA. In the 2009 NBA Summer League, the Phoenix Suns added Kawamura to their roster. He has been dubbed "Offence Machine" and very talkative as he had a radio show on Tochigi's Radio Berry FM.

His notable buzzer beaters

On May 14, 2017, he hit a buzzer beater in a relegation game 3 against Akita Northern Happinets to a win 17–16. Video
In Game 3 of 2010 JBL finals vs. Aisin SeaHorses Mikawa, he banked in a 3-pointer at the buzzer. Video
On February 4, 2017, in a B.League regular season game, he sank a  buzzer-beating to win the game against the Chiba Jets, 72–70. Video

Career statistics

NBA Summer League 

|-
|style="text-align:left;"|2009-10
|style="text-align:left;"|Phoenix Suns
| 1 || 0 || 4.4 || .000 || .000 || .000 || 0.0 || 0.0 || 0.0 || 0 || 0.0
|-

Regular season 

|-
| align="left" |  2005-06
| align="left"  rowspan="3" | OSG
|  || || ||  ||  ||  ||  ||  ||  ||  ||  
|-
| align="left" |  2006-07
|  || || ||  ||  ||  ||  ||  ||  ||  ||  
|-
| align="left" |  2007-08
| 35 ||34 ||35.9 ||.436  || .417 ||.812  || 4.1 || 1.7 ||1.2  || 0.1 ||   14.6
|-
| align="left" |  2008-09
| align="left"  rowspan="5" | Tochigi
| 35 || || 35.7 || .408 || .408 || .742 || 4.5 || 2.1 || 1.4 || 0.2 || bgcolor="CFECEC"| 20.4
|-
| align="left" |  2009-10
| 40 || ||33.5 || .430 || .375 || .754 ||3.8  || 2.7 || 1.3 ||0.2  || bgcolor="CFECEC"| 20.5
|-
| align="left" |  2010-11
| 28 || ||34.2 || .395 || .354 ||.714  || 4.8 || 2.7 || 1.1 ||0.2  || bgcolor="CFECEC"|19.5
|-
| align="left" |  2011-12
| 37 ||36 ||35.0 || .412 || .404 ||.838  || 3.9 ||bgcolor="CFECEC"|4.5  || 1.7 || 0.1 ||  bgcolor="CFECEC"|20.4
|-
| align="left" |  2012-13
|30  || 28||34.5 ||.428  || .435 || .776 || 3.9 || 3.7 ||1.2  || 0.0 || 18.3
|-
| align="left" |  2013-14
| align="left"  rowspan="2" | Wakayama
| 46 ||39 || 35.3 || .430 || .396 || .811 || 3.1 || 5.1 || 1.2 || 0.2 ||  19.2
|-
| align="left" |  2014-15
| 9 ||4 || 27.0 || .388 || .321 || .914 || 2.2 || 3.6 || 1.8 || 0.2 || 15.9
|-
| align="left" |  2015-16
| align="left" | Mitsubishi
| 42 ||30 || 21.6|| .394 || .397 || .667 || 1.8 || 1.2 || 0.5 || 0.1 ||  7.7 
|-
| align="left" |  2016-17
| align="left"  rowspan="3" | Yokohama
| 59 || 57||29.5 ||.402 || .321 || .781 || 3.1 || 3.3 || 0.9 ||0.1  ||13.4
|-
| align="left" |  2017-18
| 57 || 43||29.6 ||.416 || .368|| .807 || 3.2 || 3.6 || 0.8 ||0.1  || 13.6
|-
| align="left" |  2018-19
| 59  ||53 ||31.3 ||.426  ||.360  ||.856  ||2.6  ||4.5  ||1.3  ||0.1  ||15.6  
|-
|}

Playoffs 

|-
|style="text-align:left;"|2016-17
|style="text-align:left;"|Yokohama
| 4 ||4  || 26.37 || .353 || .286 || .826 || 4.0 || 1.0 || 1.25 || 0.75 || 15.3
|-
|style="text-align:left;"|2016-17
|style="text-align:left;"|Yokohama
| 1 || 1 || 19.48 || .000 || .000 || 1.000 || 4.0 || 2.0 || 0 || 0 || 2.0
|-
|style="text-align:left;"|2017-18
|style="text-align:left;"|Yokohama
| 4 || 4 || 28.42 || .411 || .333 || .826 || 4.8 || 5.8 || 0.75 || 0 || 18.3
|-
|style="text-align:left;"|2018-19
|style="text-align:left;"|Yokohama
| 3 || 3 || 25.21 || .429 || .125 || .929 || 2.3 || 5.7 || 1.0 || 0.67 || 12.7
|-

Early cup games 

|-
|style="text-align:left;"|2017
|style="text-align:left;"|Yokohama
| 2 || 2 || 29.59 || .438 || .500 || 1.000 || 4.0 || 3.0 || 1.0 || 0 || 9.5
|-
|style="text-align:left;"|2018
|style="text-align:left;"|Yokohama
|2 || 2 || 27.34 || .367 || .364 || 1.000 || 3.5 || 3.5 || 1.0 || 0.5 || 16.5
|-

All-star games 

|-
|style="text-align:left;"|2019
|style="text-align:left;"|B.White
| 1 || 1 || 20.01 || .545 || .375 || .000 || 0.0 || 2.0 || 0.0 || 0 || 15.0
|-

National team statistics 

|-
|style="text-align:left;"|2006
|style="text-align:left;"|Japan
| 5 ||  || 11.00 || .263 || .235 || .000 || 0.8 || 0.0 || 0.0 || 0 || 2.8
|-
|style="text-align:left;"|2007
|style="text-align:left;"|Japan
| 8 ||  || 22.07 || .451 || .477 || .500 || 2.1 || 0.9 || 0.8 || 0 || 14.6
|-

|style="text-align:left;"|2011
|style="text-align:left;"|Japan
| 9 ||  || 29.13 || .398 || .356 || .826 || 1.7 || 3.1 || 1.2 || 0 || 13.4
|-

Personal
His older brother also plays basketball. Takuya has been married with two children.

References

External links
http://www.nba.com/summerleague2009/players/index.jsp?player=sl_takuya_kawamura
http://www.asia-basket.com/player.asp?Cntry=JPN&PlayerID=68479

1986 births
Living people
Japanese men's basketball players
Utsunomiya Brex players
Nagoya Diamond Dolphins players
San-en NeoPhoenix players
SeaHorses Mikawa players
Shooting guards
Sportspeople from Iwate Prefecture
Wakayama Trians players
Yokohama B-Corsairs players
2006 FIBA World Championship players